Savella Stechishin, née Wawryniuk (August 19, 1903 – April 22, 2002), was a Ukrainian-Canadian home economist and writer, recipient of the Order of Canada.  She has been described as "an ethnocultural social maternal feminist" (Ostryzniuk, 1999).

Biography
Stechishin was born in Tudorkovychi, Austrian Galicia (today in Lviv Oblast,  Ukraine), and her family emigrated to Canada when she was nine in 1913, settling in Krydor, Saskatchewan. The Ukrainian diaspora is a large one, and her family formed part of a wave that became one of Canada's largest ethnic communities.

At age 17 she married Julian Stechyshyn, rector of the St. Petro Mohyla Institute student residence in Saskatoon and brother of Myroslaw Stechishin, and later bore three children, Anatole, Myron, and Zenia.  She completed high school and teachers' college, and obtained a Bachelor of Arts degree specializing in home economics from the University of Saskatchewan in 1930, the first Ukrainian woman to receive a degree there.

While studying, she was also the Dean of Women at the St Petro Mohyla Institute, where she organized evening courses in cooking and homemaking, and the culture and cuisine of her homeland, and public speaking for young women.  Later, she taught in public schools and lectured in Ukrainian language and in the Department of Women's Services at the University of Saskatchewan, as well as running outreach programs for Ukrainian immigrants.  She also lectured around North America and in Western Ukraine (Polish Galicia) before it was annexed by the Soviet Union in 1939.

She helped establish the Ukrainian Women's Association of Canada in 1926, and the Ukrainian Museum of Canada in 1936.

For over 25 years, she was editor of the women's page and columnist for the Winnipeg-based Ukrainian Voice weekly (Ukrayins’kyy Holos).  She also contributed to other Ukrainian women's publications in North America and Western Ukraine, and wrote for the Canadian Consumer Information Service during the Second World War.

Shechishin's most prominent book is the English-language Traditional Ukrainian Cookery (1957), which saw its eighteenth reprinting in 1995 and has sold 80,000 copies.  Her other books are in Ukrainian: Art Treasures of Ukrainian Embroidery (1950), and a 50th anniversary book for the Saskatoon branch of the Ukrainian Women's Association (1975).  She assisted her husband, Julian Stechishin, with a Ukrainian Grammar (1951), and completed his History of Ukrainian Settlement in Canada (1971) after his death—an English translation was published in 1992.

Awards
Savella Stechishin was awarded many honours.  Most notably, she was appointed to the Order of Canada on April 20, 1989, and the Saskatchewan Order of Merit in 1998.

References 

 Momryk, Myron (1996). Stechishin, Savella, MG 30, D 380, Finding Aid No. 2072. Ottawa: Manuscript Division, Canadian Archives Service.  This is a list of materials available at the Archives of Canada.
 Ostryzniuk, Natalie (1999). Savella Stechishin: a case study of Ukrainian-Canadian women activism in Saskatchewan, 1920–1945, master of arts in history thesis.  University of Regina.  . Abstract, PDF: 11.8 MB.

Works
 Stechishin, Savella (1950). Art Treasures of Ukrainian Embroidery (Mystets’ki skarby ukraïns’kykh vyshyvok).  Winnipeg: Ukrainian Women's Association of Canada.
 Stechishin, Savella ([1957] 1995). Traditional Ukrainian Cookery, 18th ed., Winnipeg: Trident Press. . 
 Stechishin, Savella (1975). Fifty years of the Olha Kobylianska Branch of the Ukrainian Women's Association of Canada, Saskatoon, Saskatchewan: 1923–1973 (Pivstorichchia, 1923–1973, Zhinochoho tovarystva imeny Olh’hy Kobylians’koï v Saskatuni, Saskachevan, pershoho viddilu soiuzu ukraïnok Kanady).  Saskatoon: Ukrainian Women's Association, Olha Kobylianska Branch.

External links 
 The mother of all Ukrainian Canadian pioneers by Chris Guly, Ukrainian Weekly
 In Memoriam: Savella Stechishin, Ukrainian Canadian pioneer and feminist (07/14/02), Ukrainian Weekly
 Savella Stechishin, 1998 Recipient – Saskatchewan Order of Merit, Saskatchewan Government Relations
 
 Archives of Savella Stechishin (Savella Stechishin fonds, R9158) are held at Library and Archives Canada

Writers from Saskatchewan
Members of the Order of Canada
Members of the Saskatchewan Order of Merit
Canadian feminists
Canadian women journalists
Canadian women non-fiction writers
Canadian food writers
Journalists from Saskatchewan
University of Saskatchewan alumni
1903 births
2002 deaths
Women's page journalists
Austro-Hungarian emigrants to Canada
Canadian people of Ukrainian descent
Canadian columnists
Canadian women columnists
Ukrainian columnists
Ukrainian women columnists